Bill Tilden defeated Wilmer Allison 6–3, 9–7, 6–4 in the final to win the gentlemen's singles tennis title at the 1930 Wimbledon Championships. Henri Cochet was the defending champion, but lost in the quarterfinals to Allison.

Seeds 

  Henri Cochet (quarterfinals)
  Bill Tilden (champion)
  Jean Borotra (semifinals)
  John Doeg (semifinals)
  George Lott (quarterfinals)
  Bunny Austin (fourth round)
  Uberto de Morpurgo (third round)
  Gar Moon (first round)

Draw

Finals

Top half

Section 1

Section 2

Section 3

Section 4

Bottom half

Section 5

Section 6

Section 7

Section 8

References

External links

Men's Singles
Wimbledon Championship by year – Men's singles